Dyschirius pumilus is a species of ground beetle in the subfamily Scaritinae. It was described by Pierre François Marie Auguste Dejean in 1825.

References

pumilus
Beetles described in 1825